West Branch is a city in Cedar and Johnson counties in the U.S. state of Iowa. The population was 2,509 as of the 2020 census.  It is the birthplace of the only American president born in Iowa, Herbert Hoover.

The Johnson County portion of West Branch is part of the Iowa City, Iowa Metropolitan Statistical Area.

History 

West Branch was laid out in 1869 by Joseph Steer. It was incorporated in 1875.

The city was first settled chiefly by Quakers from Ohio.  Its name is derived from the meeting place of the West Branch Quakers, and the location of the city on the west branch of the Wapsinonoc Creek. Most of Main Street is part of the West Branch Commercial Historic District.

Before the American Civil War, areas in and around West Branch were stops of the Underground Railroad. Abolitionist John Brown once stayed at the Maxson farm east of West Branch. He also stayed at James Townsend's inn, the Traveler's Rest, in the winter of 1856. In 2008, archaeologists found evidence of unmarked graves in nearby North Liberty Cemetery while investigating an account of 17 escaped slaves who died before reaching Canada.
 
West Branch experienced rapid growth after the Burlington, Cedar Rapids and Northern Railway was built through it.

President Herbert Hoover was born in West Branch in 1874. The Herbert Hoover Presidential Library-Museum was dedicated here by Hoover and his close friend, President Harry Truman, in 1962. The Herbert Hoover National Historic Site, which includes the Library-Museum, the Hoover Birthplace Cottage and the gravesites of President and Lou Henry Hoover, was authorized by Congress on August 12, 1965.

Geography

Demographics

2010 census
As of the census of 2010, there were 2,322 people, 947 households, and 612 families residing in the city. The racial makeup of the city was 97.0% White, 0.4% African American, 0.2% Native American, 0.6% Asian, 0.4% from other races, and 1.3% from two or more races. Hispanic or Latino of any race were 2.1% of the population.

There were 947 households, of which 33.8% had children under the age of 18 living with them, 50.2% were married couples living together, 9.3% had a female householder with no husband present, 5.2% had a male householder with no wife present, and 35.4% were non-families. 28.2% of all households were made up of individuals, and 7.9% had someone living alone who was 65 years of age or older. The average household size was 2.39 and the average family size was 2.92.

The median age in the city was 38.7 years. 24.6% of residents were under the age of 18; 8% were between the ages of 18 and 24; 25.5% were from 25 to 44; 28.4% were from 45 to 64; and 13.5% were 65 years of age or older. The gender makeup of the city was 48.8% male and 51.2% female.

2000 census
As of the census of 2000, there were 2,341 people, 840 households, and 572 families residing in the city. The racial makeup of the city was 96.71% White, 0.37% African American, 0.41% Native American, 0.91% Asian, 0.05% Pacific Islander, 0.59% from other races, and 0.96% from two or more races. Hispanic or Latino of any race were 1.74% of the population.

There were 840 households, out of which 37.6% had children under the age of 18 living with them, 53.7% were married couples living together, 10.5% had a female householder with no husband present, and 31.8% were non-families. 25.4% of all households were made up of individuals, and 8.7% had someone living alone who was 65 years of age or older. The average household size was 2.51 and the average family size was 3.03.

26.9% are under the age of 18, 7.7% from 18 to 24, 30.2% from 25 to 44, 21.4% from 45 to 64, and 13.8% who were 65 years of age or older. The median age was 36 years. For every 100 females, there were 90.4 males. For every 100 females age 18 and over, there were 89.3 males.

The median income for a household in the city was $42,500, and the median income for a family was $51,667. Males had a median income of $31,949 versus $26,379 for females. The per capita income for the city was $19,577. About 4.5% of families and 4.7% of the population were below the poverty line, including 5.1% of those under age 18 and 9.9% of those age 65 or over.

Economy
West Branch has been one of 36 communities in the Main Street Iowa program since being accepted on June 1, 2006. The program encourages downtown economic development through historic preservation.

The city's industrial park is home to a major distribution center of Cincinnati-based Procter & Gamble. The industrial park is also home to Plastic Products, Wausau, Acciona Windpower North America and, Tidewater Direct.

As of November 2007, construction was completed on Acciona Energía's wind turbine generator engineering and assembly plant, the first in North America. Production began at the plant in December 2007.

Arts and culture

Museums

West Branch is home to the Herbert Hoover National Historical Site, run by the National Park Service and Herbert Hoover Presidential Library and Museum, run by the National Archives and Records Administration.  The library holds the documentary legacy of Rose Wilder Lane and her mother, Laura Ingalls Wilder.

Landmarks
The Gruwell and Crew General Store is listed on the National Register of Historic Places. It was named as one of the most endangered historic properties in Iowa by the Iowa Historic Preservation Alliance in 2008.

Butch Pedersen Field, formerly known as Oliphant Street Field, the playing field for the West Branch High School football team, is situated just northwest of downtown.  Colloquially known as "the Little Rose Bowl", it was constructed by the Works Progress Administration by excavating a sloped field, yielding a playing field with natural seating on three sides.

Education
The West Branch Community School District operates local public schools.  It has about 800 students and includes three schools: Hoover Elementary, West Branch Middle School and West Branch High School.

Scattergood Friends School, a Quaker boarding school, is located east of the city.

Infrastructure

Transportation
Interstate 80 passes from west to east through West Branch.

Notable people

Marv Cook, football player
Mildred Adams Fenton, paleontologist
Herbert Hoover (1874–1964), 31st President of the United States (1929-1933)
Dave Rummells, PGA Tour golfer
Fine printers Harry Duncan and Allan Kornblum each printed and published books in West Branch.

References

External links

  

Cities in Cedar County, Iowa
Cities in Johnson County, Iowa
Cities in Iowa
Iowa City metropolitan area
1869 establishments in Iowa